Claude Lefebvre (born December 8, 1952 in Montreal, Quebec) is a former Canadian handball player who competed in the 1976 Summer Olympics.

He was part of the Canadian handball team which finished eleventh in the 1976 Olympic tournament. He played all five matches.

References
 profile

1952 births
Living people
Canadian male handball players
Olympic handball players of Canada
Handball players at the 1976 Summer Olympics
Sportspeople from Montreal
French Quebecers